Our Lady of Łukawiec (Polish: Matka Boża Łukawiecka), earlier Our Lady of Tartaków (Polish: Matka Boża Tartakowska), also known as Our Lady Full of Graces (Polish: Matka Boża Łaskawa) is a Roman Catholic icon of the Blessed Virgin Mary.

Description 
The painting shows the Mother of God standing one foot on the crescent moon that is on top of a dying dragon. Mary is dressed in a long, down-to-earth dress, covered with a dark blue cloak. Her hair is dissolved, reaching her shoulders, and her head is turned to the right, slightly tilted down. Mary has slightly closed eyes, and her face is focused and gentle. Hands are folded for prayer. In the lower part of the painting, under the feet of the Mother of God you can see the winged dragon, who is dying, and next to the apple lying on the ground. Above Mother of God's figure floats God the Father with a gray beard, clothed in robes, spreading His hands over Mary, protecting Her and the whole Earth. On the right and left you can see Marian symbols like lilies among thorns, Mirror of Justice, Tree of Life on the left side and the Blue Gate, the Burning Bush and the Tower of David on the right. Clouds are visible in the image. The colors of the upper part are bright, while the bottom, where the dragon is visible, the colors are dark, showing the contrast.

History

In Tartaków 
The painting was painted on a canvas stuck to the board at the beginning of the 17th century by an Italian painter and placed at the Potocki castle in the town of Tartaków. "It imagines Blessed Virgin Mary with hands folded to pray, standing on the moon, under which the rolled-up snake bites the apple. Above her, God the Father spreads his hands". After the great fire of the castle, the painting found its way to chaplain Stanisław Potocki and the local parish priest Mikołaj Kucharski in 1727. After his death, the image of the Blessed Virgin, was in 1764 placed in the local Catholic church above the baptismal font and almost from the very beginning he began to be famous for favors, which meant that he was moved the following year to the high altar. In 1765 from 9 to 24 March, the painting, as it was described, "cried". From the eyes of Our Lady, bloody tears squeezed out, which fell or dried in the image. In those days, a clear glow was visible over the church, so that it was thought that a fire would break out. Many people have also seen that the picture was colored. In 1777, the painting was considered miraculous, and two years later placed in a specially prepared, on the initiative of priest Kostkiewicz, a new huge main altar. In a special book there are 407 cases of miracles made through the image, and a number of over 300 gifts for the grace received (so-called votives).

In Łukawiec 
In 1944, the painting was successfully saved from destruction thanks to the Poles, through his deportation to the wooden Church of the Epiphany in Łukawiec near Lubaczów. Initially, in 1963, the painting found itself in Lubaczów, and the parish in Tarnoszyn also sought for it. In the end, however, the painting, famous for its graces, was handed over to the Łukawiec parish. Due to the increasing number of the believers, both from Łukawiec and from Tartaków, a decision was made to build a new church in Łukawiec. The Church of Blessed Virgin Mary Queen of Poland in Łukawiec was consecrated by Bishop Marian Jaworski in 1990. In the same year, the image of Mary was placed in the main altar. The new church became the Sanctuary of Our Lady of Łukawiec.  On June 3, 1991, the painting was crowned in Lubaczów by Pope John Paul II during one of his pilgrimages to Poland. On May 15, 2004, a dedicated and crowned copy of the painting was donated to the church in Tartaków. In 2016, the painting underwent renovation in Krakow. On June 3, 2016, the 25th anniversary of the coronation of the miraculous image of Our Lady of Łukawiec fell out. On this occasion a new huge altar was made in the parish church. On June 4, 2016, a miraculous picture was placed in the new altar. The consecration of the new altar was made by Archbishop Mieczysław Mokrzycki, who comes from Łukawiec on June 8, 2016 during the main anniversary celebrations. From now on, the picture is solemnly unveiled and shaded by the sound of a fanfare and a song to the Mother of God.

References 

Shrines to the Virgin Mary
Catholic Church in Poland
Catholic devotions
Paintings of the Virgin Mary
Łukawiec, Lubaczów County